Rancho Sespe was a  Mexican land grant in present-day Ventura County, California given in 1833  by Governor José Figueroa to Carlos Antonio Carrillo.  The grant encompassed the Santa Clara River Valley between Piru Creek on the east and Santa Paula Creek on the west, and was bounded to the north and south by the mountains, and included present day Fillmore.

History
Carlos Antonio Carrillo (17831852), the son of José Raimundo Carrillo of the prominent Santa Barbara  family, had been elected to the assembly and was later Governor of Alta California from 1837-1838.  Carrillo claimed the Sespe grant was for six square leagues (approximately ). Carrillo took possession of the grant in 1842 and as required, built an adobe house; although the Carrillo family remained in Santa Barbara.  Carrillo died in 1852 and his wife Josefa died in 1853.  Thomas Wallace More and his brothers, Andrew and Henry, purchased the entire rancho in 1854 from the estate of Josefa Carrillo.

With the cession of California to the United States following the Mexican-American War, the 1848 Treaty of Guadalupe Hidalgo provided that the land grants would be honored.  As required by the Land Act of 1851, a claim for Rancho Sespe was filed by Carrillo with the Public Land Commission in 1852, and six square leagues confirmed in 1856.  But the U.S. government appealed the confirmation based on evidence that the Expediente had been altered from two square leagues to read six square leagues. Complicating the dispute, More’s attorney, Hinchman, agreed to the government’s much smaller description of Rancho Sespe without the More’s approval.

By 1860, the More brothers were the largest landowner in Santa Barbara County (which at the time included all of present-day Ventura County).  Besides Rancho Sespe, the More brothers owned the neighboring Rancho Santa Paula y Saticoy, and also owned Santa Rosa Island, Rancho Lompoc and Rancho Mission Vieja de la Purisma.  The drought of 1863 and 1864 forced the More brothers to dissolve their partnership and divide up their lands. T.W. More took control of Rancho Sespe and inherited the difficulties surrounding its legal boundaries.

In 1865, the US Supreme Court dismissed More's appeal of the decision. Two surveys of Rancho Sespe were made by Charles F. Hoffmann. This survey was submitted and rejected.

Settlers, or squatters as they were also called, began to arrive in the Santa Clara River Valley seeking public lands during the mid to late 1860s, following the American Civil War.  Rancho Santa Paula y Saticoy to the west was subdivided in 1867, and  many settlers  purchased land in the area west of  Santa Paula.  Settlers hoping to avail themselves of free land offered by the Homestead Act had to locate available public lands.  It was often difficult for homesteaders to know if they were settling on public or private lands.

T.W. More continued to fight for the rest of his six square leagues, angering the Sespe Settlers League, who had banded together to protect their homesteads.  More filed an application in 1875 to buy the remaining four square leagues from the government under the "pre-emption" laws of 1866. This application was denied by the U.S. Land Office in 1875.  When, during the drought of 1876-1877, More began to trench an irrigation ditch on his land, the settlers believed that More was seeking to deprive them of water rights from the Sespe Creek and Santa Clara River, further angering the settlers.  On March 24, 1877, T.W. More was shot and killed while attempting to extinguish a barn fire on his ranch.  Following More’s death in 1877,  the U.S. Land Office overturned the 1875 ruling, allowing More’s heirs to buy the disputed lands. This decision was overturned on appeal, in 1878.   With the exception of settlers who purchased land from the heirs of T.W. More, when they began to subdivide their property during the 1880s, the majority of residents who finally settled in the Rancho Sespe area, had homesteaded their land.

See also
Santa Clara River Valley
Santa Clara River (California)
Sespe Creek

References

 

Sespe
Sespe
Santa Clara River (California)
Topatopa Mountains
Sespe